Marat Viktorovich Baglai (born 13 March 1931) is the Soviet and Russian lawyer who served as 3rd Chairman of the Constitutional Court of Russia from 1997 to 2003. He is corresponding member of Russian Academy of Sciences.

Biography

Early life
Born on 13 March  1931 in Baku. He graduated from the law faculty of Rostov State University in 1954.

In 1957 he graduated from the graduate Institute and Law named after A. Vyshinsky of the Academy of Sciences of the USSR and defended the dissertation on competition of a scientific degree of candidate of legal Sciences on the topic "Legal issues of the strike movement in the United States."

From 1957 to 1962 he worked as a researcher at the Institute of State and law of the Academy of Sciences. From 1962 to 1967 he was associate Professor of the Moscow State Institute of International Relations (MGIMO).

In 1967 he defended his thesis for the degree of doctor of law on the topic "Social activities of the imperialist state: (Political and legal aspects)".

In 1970 he received the title of Professor of constitutional law. From 1967 to 1977 he worked as head of the Department of the Institute of international labor movement of the USSR Academy of Sciences.

From 1977 to 1995 he was Vice-rector of the Higher School of Trade Union Movement. From 1977 to 1995 he also served as Professor of Constitutional Law at the Moscow State Institute of International Relations.

On 7 February 1995 Marat Baglai was elected as judge of the Constitutional Court of Russia.

Currently he is a Professor of MGIMO, where he lectures on Constitutional Law of Foreign Countries.

Chairman of the Constitutional Court

On 13 February 1995 for the first time nominated for the post of Chairman of the Constitutional Court, but lost the election to Vladimir Tumanov.

On 20 February 1997, he again ran for the Chairman of the Constitutional Court. He was elected Chairman of the Constitutional Court of the Russian Federation for a three-year term. On 21 February 2000 he was re-elected as Chairman of the Constitutional Court of Russia.

On 7 May 2000, Vladimir Putin was administered the oath of office by Marat Baglai.

On February 21, 2003 Baglai's term expired and Valery Zorkin was elected the new Chairman of the Constitutional Court. As Baglai was already over 70 years old, he also retired from the post of Judge of the constitutional Court.

Honours and awards
 Order of Merit for the Fatherland of 2nd class (11 March 2001) - for great personal contribution to strengthening of constitutional justice and long-term fruitful work;
 Order of Friendship of Peoples (1975);
 Honored worker of science of the Russian Federation (12 July 1996) - for merits in scientific activity;
 Honoured Lawyer of Russia (5 June 2003) - for his large contribution to strengthening the rule of law and many years of diligent work;
 Presidential Certificate of Honour (12 December 2008) - for active participation in preparation of the draft Constitution of the Russian Federation and his significant contribution to development of the democratic basis of the Russian Federation;
 Governmental Certificate of Honour (12 March 2001) - for meritorious activity on behalf of the state, long-term fruitful work and in connection with the 70th anniversary of his birth;
 Badge of the Central Election Commission of the Russian Federation (2008);
 Public order "Russian nation" (2009).

References

Judges of the Constitutional Court of Russia
Russian politicians
Russian legal scholars
Scholars of constitutional law
Living people
1931 births